The Winchester Model 20 is a single-barreled shotgun that was produced from 1920 to 1924.

It is not semi-automatic or pump-action, and is loaded manually by lifting up the barrel and loading the shells at the breech. This is called a break or hinge action. The model 20 came in .410 bore.

The total production reached approximately 24,000.

Notes

Resources 
Sparetimeactivities.net profile

Winchester Repeating Arms Company firearms
Single-shot shotguns of the United States